Junshan Zhang from the Arizona State University, Tempe, AZ was named Fellow of the Institute of Electrical and Electronics Engineers (IEEE) in 2012 for contributions to cross-layer optimization of wireless networks.

Education
 Ph.D., electrical engineering, Purdue University, 2000
 M.S., statistics, University of Georgia, 1996
 B.S., electrical engineering, HUST – China, 1993,

References 

Fellow Members of the IEEE
Living people
Arizona State University faculty
Purdue University College of Engineering alumni
Huazhong University of Science and Technology alumni
Year of birth missing (living people)